Paweł Baraszkiewicz (born May 20, 1977, in Działdowo) is a Polish sprint canoeist who has competed since the mid-1990s. He has been world champion four times in the Canadian canoe C-2 event with partner Daniel Jędraszko.

Baraszkiewicz debuted at the 1996 Summer Olympics in Atlanta, but was eliminated in the first semifinal of the C-2 500 m event.

They also won a silver medal at the 2000 Summer Olympics in Sydney in the C-2 500 m event. That same year Baraskiewicz also won two C-2 gold medals at the European championships (in the 500 m with Jedrasko and also in the 1000 m with Michał Gajownik).

At the 2004 Summer Olympics in Athens, Baraszkiewicz and Jedrasko disappointingly failed to win a medal. Baraszkiewicz publicly voiced his suspicion that some of their rivals were guilty of doping.

In 2005 Baraszkiewicz switched to the individual C-1 event, winning silver at the 2005 ICF Canoe Sprint World Championships over 500 m.

2006 proved a frustrating season, with three fourth-place finishes in major C-1 finals (European 200 m & 500 m and World Championship 500 m). He did however pick up a world championship silver medal with Poland's four-man C-4 500 m crew. At the end of the season he again became Polish national C-1 champion over all three race distances.

Baraszkiewicz is a member of the Posnania Poznań club. He is 175 cm (5'9") tall and weighs 80 kg (196 lbs). All told, he has earned as of 2010 a total of fourteen medals at the ICF Canoe Sprint World Championships.

Awards
For hts sport achievements, he received: 
 Golden Cross of Merit in 2000; 
 Knight's Cross of the Order of Polonia Restituta (5th Class) in 2007.

References

External links
 

1977 births
Canoeists at the 1996 Summer Olympics
Canoeists at the 2000 Summer Olympics
Canoeists at the 2004 Summer Olympics
Canoeists at the 2008 Summer Olympics
Living people
Olympic canoeists of Poland
Olympic silver medalists for Poland
Polish male canoeists
Olympic medalists in canoeing
People from Działdowo
ICF Canoe Sprint World Championships medalists in Canadian
Sportspeople from Warmian-Masurian Voivodeship
Medalists at the 2000 Summer Olympics